Dot Foods is the largest foodservice redistribution company in the United States. Dot offers over 112,000 products from 830 food industry manufacturers. Dot consolidates those products and delivers in less-than-truckload (LTL) quantities to distributors nationwide on a weekly basis. Distributors can buy a mix of temperatures and products, with a combined minimum of just 5,000 pounds.

History
Dot Foods was founded in 1960, by Robert F. Tracy, and was originally named Associated Dairy Products to reflect the nature of the business at the time. Tracy began the enterprise by selling an assortment of dairy products out of the back of the family station wagon. Tracy was originally from Jerseyville, Illinois, and moved to Mount Sterling after his marriage.

In 2016, Dot Foods was listed at number 65 on Forbes' list of America’s Largest Private Companies with a reported revenue of $6.2 billion in 2016.

In 2017, John Tracy moved from CEO to executive chairman in the company, and his brother, Joe Tracy, became CEO. Another brother, Dick Tracy, was appointed president. All three are sons of founder Robert Tracy and his wife, Dorothy.

Locations 
Dot Foods has eleven distribution centers in addition to its headquarters: 
 Mount Sterling, Illinois (headquarters)
 Ardmore, Oklahoma
 Bullhead City, Arizona
 Burley, Idaho
 Cambridge City, Indiana
 Dyersburg, Tennessee
 Liverpool, New York
 Modesto, California
 Vidalia, Georgia
 Williamsport, Maryland
 University Park, Illinois
 Bear, Delaware
 Chesterfield, Missouri (Sales headquarters, offices only)

References

External links

1960 establishments in Illinois
Catering and food service companies of the United States
Companies based in Brown County, Illinois
Privately held companies of the United States
Food and drink companies established in 1960